Rigan (also Romanized as Rīgān; also known as Rīkān) is a village in Khafri Rural District, in the Central District of Sepidan County, Fars Province, Iran. At the 2006 census, its population was 738, in 185 families.

References 

Populated places in Sepidan County